Ma'aly Kaware (born 11 March 1983) is a Palestinian footballer who plays as a midfielder for West Bank League club Markaz Shabab Al-Am'ari and the Palestine national team.

References

External links

1983 births
Living people
Palestinian footballers
Association football midfielders
Palestine international footballers
21st-century Palestinian people